Dicranucha crateropis is a moth of the family Gelechiidae. It was described by Edward Meyrick in 1921. It is found in Zimbabwe.

The wingspan is 15–16 mm. The forewings are pale ochreous, with a band along the costa and the terminal third sprinkled with dark fuscous. There are small blackish spots on the base of the costa and dorsum and sometimes a small mark between these. The stigmata are large, round and blackish, the plical beneath the first discal. There is a similar spot on the dorsum beneath the second discal and a submarginal row of large irregular blackish dots around the posterior part of the costa and termen. The hindwings are light grey.

References

Endemic fauna of Zimbabwe
Moths described in 1921
Dicranucha
Taxa named by Edward Meyrick